Edmund Seidel (born July 10, 1878 in the German Empire) was an American newspaper editor and politician from New York.

Life
The family emigrated to the United States in 1882. He attended the common schools in Philadelphia.

He ran on the Socialist Labor ticket for the New York Court of Appeals at the state elections in 1908, 1912 and 1914; and for Mayor of New York City at the New York City mayoral election, 1917. After the death of Daniel DeLeon in 1914, Seidel became the chief editor of the official Socialist Labor newspaper The People, but was ousted in 1918 for advocating a merger with the Socialist Party.

Seidel was a Socialist member of the New York State Senate (22nd D.) in 1921 and 1922. In November 1921, he ran unsuccessfully on the Socialist ticket for Borough President of the Bronx.

Sources
 New York Red Book (1922; pg. 80)
 PETITIONS ALL FILED; 4 PARTIES IN FIELD in NYT on August 21, 1921
 Others by Darcy G. Richardson (Vol. IV, pg. 110f)

1878 births
Year of death missing
New York (state) state senators
Socialist Party of America politicians from New York (state)
Socialist Labor Party of America politicians from New York (state)
Politicians from Philadelphia
Emigrants from the German Empire to the United States
Politicians from the Bronx